Helen Simpson  may refer to:
 Helen Simpson (lecturer) (1890–1960), New Zealand teacher, university lecturer and writer
 Helen de Guerry Simpson (1897–1940), Australian novelist
 Helen Simpson (author) (born 1957), British short story writer